The 2006 winners of the Torneo di Viareggio (in English, the Viareggio Tournament, officially the Viareggio Cup World Football Tournament Coppa Carnevale), the annual youth football tournament held in Viareggio, Tuscany, are listed below.

Format

The 48 teams are seeded in 12 pools, split up into 6-pool groups. Each team from a pool meets the others in a single tie. The winning club from each pool and two best runners-up from both group A and group B progress to the final knockout stage. All matches in the final rounds are single tie. The Round of 16 envisions penalties and no extra time, while the rest of the final round matches include 30 minutes extra time with Silver goal rule and penalties to be played if the draw between teams still holds. Semifinal losing teams play 3rd-place final with penalties after regular time. The winning sides play the final with extra time, no Silver goal rule and repeat the match if the draw holds.

Participating teams
Italian teams

  Arezzo
  Ascoli
  Atalanta
  Avellino
  Benevento
  Cisco Roma
  Empoli
  Fiorentina
  Genoa
  Inter Milan
  Juventus
  Lazio
  Livorno
  Lucchese
  Messina
  Milan
  Modena
  Palermo
  Parma
  Pistoiese
  Serie D Representatives
  Roma
  Siena
  Ternana
  Torino
  Treviso
  Triestina
  Udinese

European teams

  Anderlecht
  Belasica
  Brondby
  Grasshoppers
  Naftex
  San Marino
  Newcastle
  Partizan
  Red Star Belgrade

Asian teams
  Paxtakor

African Team
  Chambishi

American teams

  Cerro Porteño
  Danubio
  Inter Soccer Boston
  New York Stars
  Juventud
  Necaxa
  Pumas
  Santos Laguna

Oceanian teams
   APIA Tigers

Group stage

Group 1

Group 2

Group 3

Group 4

Group 5

Group 6

Group 7

Group 8

Group 9

Group 10

Group 11

Group 12

Knockout stage

Final

Champions

Notes

External links
 Official Site (Italian)
 Results on RSSSF.com

Torneo di Viareggio
2006 in association football
2005–06 in Italian football